Petr Lukáš (born 24 April 1978) is a Czech football defender who last played for FK Teplice in the Czech Republic. He was once the club captain. His brother Pavel is also a professional footballer.

He won the Gambrinus liga with Slovan Liberec in 2002.

In January 2011, Lukáš went on loan to LASK Linz. He marked his return to Teplice six-month later on his first match after returning, scoring the winning goal in the 4–3 opening day win over Baník Ostrava.

References

 Profile at iDNES.cz

1978 births
Living people
Footballers from Prague
Czech footballers
Czech expatriate footballers
Czech First League players
FK Teplice players
FK Jablonec players
FC Slovan Liberec players
AC Sparta Prague players
LASK players
Expatriate footballers in Austria
Association football defenders